The Asian and Oceanian Zone is one of the three zones of regional Davis Cup competition in 2005.

In the Asian and Oceanian Zone there are four different groups in which teams compete against each other to advance to the next group.

Participating teams

Draw

Indonesia relegated to Group II in 2006.
Pakistan and India advance to World Group play-off.

First Round Matches

Pakistan vs. Thailand

Chinese Taipei vs. Japan

Indonesia vs. Uzbekistan

India vs. China

Second Round Matches

Pakistan vs. Chinese Taipei

India vs. Uzbekistan

First-round play-offs

Japan vs. Thailand

China vs. Indonesia

Second-round play-offs

Thailand vs. Indonesia

References
Draw

Asia/Oceania Zone Group I
Davis Cup Asia/Oceania Zone